John F. O'Neill is a philosopher. He is professor of political economy at the University of Manchester. He has published on subjects related to political economy and philosophy, philosophy and environmental policy, political theory, environmental ethics, and the philosophy of science.

Academic history
John O'Neill held the post of professor of philosophy at Lancaster University.

Previously, he was on the faculty of the University of Sussex and the University of Wales.

Critical reaction
Reviewing O'Neill's book The Market: Ethics, Knowledge and Politics, Mark Peacock wrote that "O'Neill defends an Aristotelian perfectionism which allows for a plurality of goods pursued for their own sake. [...] The argument is sound, but does not answer the liberal objection to Aristotle that individuals must be allowed to pursue what they believe to be the good."

Selected works
Books

Articles

References

External links
 
 

English philosophers
Academics of the University of Manchester
Year of birth missing (living people)
Living people
English male non-fiction writers